The 1991–92 Courage League National Division Three was the fifth full season of rugby union within the third tier of the English league system, currently known as National League 1.  Each side played one match against the other teams, playing a total of twelve matches each.

Participating teams and locations

League table

See also
 English Rugby Union Leagues
 English rugby union system
 Rugby union in England

References

N3
National League 1 seasons